Second Intention is a game development consultancy based in Wellington, New Zealand.

Second Intention specialises in high-end graphical technology for both video game console and PC games, such as post-processing effects, as well as algorithm optimisation, and performance tuning. Additional to programming services, they can also produce art assets as required. They have contributed to games such as Killzone by Guerrilla Games.

Video game companies of New Zealand